Erkki Vihtilä (born 14 May 1951) is a Finnish footballer. He played in 41 matches for the Finland national football team from 1971 to 1979.

References

External links
 

1951 births
Living people
Finnish footballers
Finland international footballers
Place of birth missing (living people)
Association footballers not categorized by position